La Nova Esquerra de l'Eixample is a neighborhood in the Eixample district of Barcelona, Catalonia (Spain). Originally it formed a single unit, called Esquerra de l'Eixample, with the current neighborhood l'Antiga Esquerra de l'Eixample.

In this neighborhood there are the Can Batlló's three buildings (currently the Industrial School), the former prison La Model, the park Parc Joan Miró, located in the emplacement of the former city's slaughterhouse, the bullfighting ring Les Arenes, which is nowadays a commercial center, and the Casa Golferichs.

Due to its considerable Romanian migrant population, La Nova Esquerra de l'Eixample has been defined as a "Little Romania".

References

External links 
 Web of La Nova Esquerra de l'Eixample, Barcelona's City Hall Web (Catalan)

Nova Esquerra de l'Eixample, la
Nova Esquerra de l'Eixample, la